Penicillium patens is an anamorph species of the genus of Penicillium.

References

patens
Fungi described in 1985